Hebbard is an English language surname. People who share this surname include:

 Col Hebbard (born 1936), Australian rules footballer with Essendon
 James Hebbard (1862–1941), mine manager in Australia
 William S. Hebbard (1863–1930), American architect in San Diego County, California

See also
Hubbard (surname)

References